John Arlinton González (born February 2, 1989) is a Colombian football midfielder, who played for Millonarios in the Copa Mustang.

References 

1989 births
Living people
Colombian footballers
Millonarios F.C. players
Association football midfielders
Sportspeople from Cauca Department